Francis Ryck, born Yves Delville, March 4, 1920 in Paris and died August 19, 2007 in Paris, was a French author of crime and spy novels. He also used the pen names Yves Dierick and Edo Ryck

Works in English translation
Loaded Gun (original title: Drôle de pistolet), (HarperCollins, 1971)
Woman Hunt (original title: La Peau de Torpédo), (HarperCollins, 1972)
Green Light, Red Catch (original title: Feu vert pour poissons rouges), (HarperCollins, 1972)
Sacrificial Pawn (original title: L'Incroyant), (HarperCollins, 1973)
Undesirable Company (original title: Le Compagnon indésirable), (HarperCollins, 1974)
Account Rendered (original title: Le Prix des choses), (HarperCollins, 1975), also published as The Sern Charter (Coward, McCann & Geoghegan, 1976)

References

1920 births
2007 deaths
French male writers
French crime fiction writers
20th-century French male writers